Johann Friedrich II (1683–1764) was a ruler of the principality of Hohenlohe-Öhringen.

References 

1683 births
1764 deaths
Counts of Hohenlohe